Jim Lill is an American country musician. He is best known for his YouTube channel where he makes guitar videos. He has been part of the bands of country artists Josh Thompson, Josh Gracin, and Craig Wayne Boyd.

Early life 
Jim Lill was born in Portland, MI.

Career 
Lill attended Belmont University in Nashville, TN and graduated with a degree in Audio Engineering Technology. He played guitar and other instruments for many country artists during and after college. He interned at Station West Studios where artists including Dierks Bentley and Brad Paisley had albums recorded and mixed. He runs a popular YouTube channel where he posts country music and guitar related videos. He has also contributed to Guitar Player magazine, Guitar World magazine and Premier Guitar magazine.

YouTube Channel 

On January 24, 2022, Lill posted a video to youtube called Tested: Where Does The Tone Come From In An Electric Guitar? exploring the way different parts of an electric guitar affected the sound it produced. By May 14 of the same year, this video reached over one million views. He continued the series with videos including Tested: Where Does The Tone Come From In A Speaker Cabinet? and Tested: Where Does The Tone Come From In A Guitar Amplifier?, as well as other videos like This Weird Guitar Cab Was The Secret Sound Of Country Radio, exploring the gear of Nashville session guitarist J.T. Corenflos.

On October 19, 2022, Jim Lill's YouTube channel passed 100,000 subscribers.

References

External links
 Jim Lill YouTube Channel

American country guitarists
American country singer-songwriters
American male guitarists
Year of birth missing (living people)
Living people
People from Portland, Michigan
Country musicians from Michigan
American male singer-songwriters
Singer-songwriters from Michigan